Stephen Hodder  (born 1956) is an English architect who won the RIBA's Stirling Prize in 1996. He is also a partner at his own practice Hodder Associates which was founded in 1992 in Manchester. In 2012 Hodder was elected for a two-year term as the president of the RIBA (2013-2015).

Background
Hodder started his architectural education in 1975,  and graduated from Manchester University in 1982 and joined Building Design Partnership but left after a year and set his own firm up after he was offered a project by a family member. Initially named Hodder Lees Partnership, later Hodder Sanderson, the practice became Hodder Associates in 1992.

One of his first jobs came after he won a competition to build Lytham St Annes Station.

He joined the teaching staff at the Manchester School of Architecture. In 2011 he chairs the Professional Advisory Board at the School.

Awards 
Hodder won the Royal Fine Art Commission/Sunday Times Building of the Year Award for his design of Colne Swimming pool in Lancashire in the first year that his practice opened.

In 1995, Hodder Associates won the Grand Prize at the Royal Academy's Summer Exhibition and in 1996 he was awarded the RIBA Stirling Prize for the Centenary Building, University of Salford.

Hodder was appointed Member of the Order of the British Empire (MBE) in 1998 for services to architecture.

He was awarded an Honorary Degree of Doctor of Arts by Manchester Metropolitan University in 2006 in recognition of his distinguished contribution to architecture locally, nationally and internationally.

References

External links
Hodder + Partners
Manchester Metropolitan University's Honorands

1956 births
Alumni of the Manchester School of Architecture
Architects from Greater Manchester
Living people
People associated with the University of Salford
Stirling Prize laureates
People from Stockport
Members of the Order of the British Empire
Academics of the University of Manchester